Fish Warrior is a television series on National Geographic Channel hosted by Jakub Vágner.  The first season aired in July 2010, with the second season following in March 2011. Jakub Vágner is a lifelong angler and world record-holding fisherman who embarks on extreme fishing expeditions to the most remote regions of the world.

Episodes

Season 1: (2010)

Season 2: (2011)

See also
River Monsters
Monster Fish
Big Fish Man

References

External links
National Geographic: Fish Warrior

Fishing television series
National Geographic (American TV channel) original programming
Nature educational television series
2010 American television series debuts
2011 American television series endings